The NMBS/SNCB Class 77 (also known as HLD 77 or HLR 77) is a class of 4 axle B'B' road switcher diesel hydraulic locomotive designed for shunting and freight work manufactured at the beginning of the 2000s by Siemens Schienenfahrzeugtechnik and later by Vossloh at the Maschinenbau Kiel plant in Kiel, Germany for the National Railway Company of Belgium (SNCB/NMBS).

Background and design
The initial order for 90 locomotives was given to Siemens in 1997 to replace an aging diesel fleet; the railway opted for a locomotive suitable for both shunting and mainline use, rather than separate classes.

The locomotives were variants of the standard MaK G1200 series design, and are considered a development of the MaK G1205 type. The locomotive is an off-centre cab design with a two-speed voith hydraulic transmission driving all axles via cardan shafts. Auxiliary electrical supply is provided by an engine mounted alternator. Unlike many other MaK locomotives which use a MTU or CAT 12-cylinder V engine the locomotive has an ABC 6-cylinder inline engine.

The first locomotive was delivered in October 1999, and worked satisfactorily; a second order for 80 locomotives was given in June 2001.

Operations
The first locomotive entered service in February 2004. All 170 units were operational by June 2005.

Due to its relatively low power the locomotives work in multiple on heavy freight trains.

Equipment variations 
Sets of the class vary in the type of equipment they carry:

See also
NS Class 6400 similar concept diesel electric freight locomotives built by MaK/Siemens between 1988 and 1995 for the railways of the Netherlands.

References

External links

 Images: SNCB série 77, www.rail.lu
 Images: Belgian freight diesel class 77, www.railfaneurope.net

NMBS SNCB Class 77
Diesel locomotives of Belgium
B-B locomotives
Vossloh locomotives
MaK locomotives
Railway locomotives introduced in 1990
Standard gauge locomotives of Belgium
Diesel-hydraulic locomotives
Freight locomotives